Jo Pitt (22 February 1979 – 2 May 2013) was a Scottish equestrian Paralympian.

Early life 
Pitt came from Huntly, Aberdeenshire, and studied at Oatridge College, West Lothian. She had right-sided hemiplegic cerebral palsy.

Career 
Pitt represented Great Britain at the 2004 Athens Paralympics. She won British Dressage's winter championship title in April 2013. She was in the para-equestrian dressage team that won gold at the 2010 World Equestrian Games.

Death 
Pitt died 2 May 2013. She had been living with pulmonary veno-occlusive disease. She had recently moved to Dereham, Norfolk to live with her fiancé, Rory.

References

1979 births
2013 deaths
People from Huntly
People from Dereham
Equestrians at the 2004 Summer Paralympics
Paralympic equestrians of Great Britain
Sportspeople with cerebral palsy
Scottish disabled sportspeople
Sportspeople from Aberdeenshire
Alumni of Scotland's Rural College